Michael Fora (born October 30, 1995) is a Swiss professional ice hockey defenseman who is currently playing with HC Davos of the National League (NL).

Playing career
Fora made his NL debut with HC Ambri-Piotta in the 2015–16 season, appearing in 32 games and putting up 6 points (3 goals).

Fora served as captain of the team for the 2017–18 season. On December 23, 2017, Fora agreed to an early three-year contract extension with HC Ambri-Piotta through the 2020–21 season. The contract contained an NHL-out clause.

Undrafted, on June 15, 2018, Fora signed a two-year entry-level contract with the Carolina Hurricanes of the National Hockey League (NHL). He participated in the Hurricanes training camp and played preseason games with the Hurricanes before being assigned to the Charlotte Checkers of the American Hockey League (AHL) to start the 2018–19 season. Fora played one game in the AHL before asking to part ways with the organization in order to return to HC Ambri-Piotta.

On 3 December 2021, while in his eighth season with Ambri-Piotta 2021–22, Fora agreed to a four-year contract starting in 2022–23 with HC Davos.

International play

Fora was named to Switzerland men's national team for the 2018 and the 2019 IIHF World Championship.

Career statistics

Regular season and playoffs

International

References

External links

1995 births
Living people
HC Ambrì-Piotta players
Charlotte Checkers (2010–) players
HC Davos players
Kamloops Blazers players
Swiss ice hockey defencemen
People from Bellinzona District
Ice hockey players at the 2022 Winter Olympics
Olympic ice hockey players of Switzerland
Sportspeople from Ticino